The Slovak Democratic and Christian Union – Democratic Party (SDKÚ-DS) was a liberal-conservative, Christian-democratic political party in Slovakia. The SDKÚ-DS was a member of the Centrist Democrat International and was a member of the European People's Party until 2018, when it was expelled.

SDKÚ was a major right-wing conservative party in Slovakia for 12 years. During their governance, Slovakia became member of European Union and North Atlantic Treaty Organization. SDKÚ-DS was marginalized after the 2012 parliamentary election, when it received only 6% of votes. In another four years it lost the most of its MPs and the party received only 0.26% of votes in 2016 leaving it without parliamentary representation. The party remains inactive since.

History

Foundation
In 1998, SDK was created as coalition of five small centre-right and centre-left parties intending to contest the Slovak parliamentary elections that year. The initial agreement was to form a party with 150 members and dissolve it after elections in 1998. After successful 1998 elections, SDK formed government with KDH, SDĽ and SMK-MKP. This initial agreement was not successful, and Prime Minister Mikuláš Dzurinda (KDH) announced formation of new party - Slovak Democratic and Christian Union (SDKÚ). Some SDK members joined the new party while others returned to their original parties. The new party was registered on 18 February 2000. On 18 November Constitution congress elected Mikuláš Dzurinda as chairman, vice chairmen being Edvard Kukan, Zuzana Martináková, Milan Kňažko and Ľubomír Harach. Gabriel Palacka became responsible for finances.

First time in government: 1998–2006 
After its creation, majority of ministers of Slovak government were members of SDKÚ. SDKÚ was considered to be most reform oriented party. Its coalition partners were Party of the Hungarian Coalition, Party of Civic Understanding and Party of the Democratic Left.

In the parliamentary election of 17 June 2006, the party won 18.4% of the popular vote and 31 out of 150 seats in the National Council. Despite losing a large number of votes, the party was still able to form coalition government with former partners such as the Christian Democratic Movement, Party of the Hungarian Coalition and new party Alliance of the New Citizen. However, the opposition centre-left populist Smer-SD could able to form coalition with Slovak National Party and

Second time in government: 2010–2012 
For the 2010 parliamentary election, Dzurinda yielded the number-one slot on the party's list to Iveta Radičová, though he remained party chairman. In this election, the party won 15.42% of popular vote corresponding to 28 seats in the National Council. Iveta Radičová become the first female prime minister in history of Slovakia, by forming a new centre-right coalition government consisted of SDKÚ-DS, SaS, MOST-HÍD and KDH. By custom, president Ivan Gašparovič first gave charge to form a new government to winning party SMER-SD and its leader Robert Fico, who was unable to do so due to Smer-SD and SNS only having 71 seats. The centre-right coalition Government collapsed on 11 October 2011 after lost confidence in parliament. Radičová subsequently decided not take candidacy in next elections and served as prime minister until a social democratic government took office on 4 April 2012.

2012 election 
Mikuláš Dzurinda led party to 2012 parliamentary election. The party was defeated badly, receiving just 6.09% of the votes and losing more than half of its seats.  Dzurinda chose to resign from his position as the chairman of SKDU, and a party congress was held on 19 May 2012 so that a new leader could be chosen. Pavol Frešo, Lucia Žitňanská and Viliam Novotný were the candidates, Frešo finally won with 242 out of 404 votes. Lucia Žitňanská received 142 votes and announced she will not be a candidate for the position of vice-chairperson.

In the 2014 European elections, SDKÚ-DS came third place nationally, receiving 7.75% of the vote and electing 2 MEPs.

Out of 11 PMs elected in 2012 only 1 remained in the party as of 2015.

2016 election 
The party was led by Pavol Frešo. However, during the previous term SDKÚ-DS practically fell apart from inside, when its own members of parliament chose to leave the party. As a result, Frešo has a tough position and even if his campaign was led along with Slovak right-wing consensus against the SMER-SD party, it failed. While gaining only 0,27% of votes and losing 95% of its previous voters in the election of 5.3.2016, the party has received its worst result in history. SDKÚ-DS has won only in one village, Pavlovce in Rimavská Sobota District. Frešo has commented that SDKÚ-DS as the only party has defended openly pro-European ideas, opposing the building of fences against the immigrants in European migrant crisis. The chairman said that the situation was a big challenge for the presidium.

Decline and dissolution
A party congress was held on 2 July 2016. Pavol Frešo stepped down from leadership of the party. New Vice-Chairmans were elected. The leader was expected to be elected later in 2016. It was reported in April 2018 that party de facto ceased to exist as it lacks membership and structure. The party was expelled from European People's Party as a result. Igor Rattaj took over party's property and became owner of Party's trademark during September 2018. Rattaj stated that party is now only the Trademark and he will sell it if anyone expresses interest. Leader of the Party Milan Roman at the time ran for the position of Mayor in Skalice as an independent candidate.

Ideology

SDKÚ-DS were a centre-right liberal conservative party, presenting itself as an alternative to the social-democratic and populist ideology of the Direction – Social Democracy (Smer-SD) party.  After the general elections in 2010, SDKÚ-DS reached an agreement with other centre-right parties and formed the government of Slovakia. The party criticised the policies of Robert Fico's Smer-SD party, calling them irresponsible, unsustainable and populist. SDKÚ-DS was the fifth largest party in the National Council during years 2012–2016. Its policy included continuing in reforms that took place before 2006, including tax reform, welfare benefits cuts, pensions reform, healthcare reform etc. SDKÚ-DS was then organised into four sections:

 Team for recovery and modernisation, led by Ivan Mikloš,
 Team for a dignified life, led by Iveta Radičová,
 Anti-crisis team, led by newcomer Eugen Jurzyca,
 Team for law and justice, led by Lucia Žitňanská.

The main partners of SDKÚ-DS were politically similar parties: Christian Democratic Movement, Freedom and Solidarity, and Most-Híd. Until 2012, these parties were in a coalition government with SDKÚ-DS.

Election results

National Council

Presidential

European Parliament

References

External links
Official website (English section)

 
Catholic political parties
Member parties of the European People's Party
2000 establishments in Slovakia
Political parties established in 2000
Political parties disestablished in 2018
Christian democratic parties in Slovakia
Liberal conservative parties in Slovakia